Vivian Leona Mead Caver (June 13, 1928 – August 22, 2021) was an American politician in the state of Washington. Appointed to a 37th District vacancy, Caver was the third African-American woman to serve in the Washington House of Representatives, serving the 37th district from 1994 to 1995. An alumnus of Morgan State College and the University of Washington, she was a human rights activist.

She directed the Seattle Human Rights Commission before her appointment to the Washington State House of Representatives.

She died on August 22, 2021, in Seattle, Washington, at age 93.

References

1928 births
2021 deaths
University of Washington alumni
Democratic Party members of the Washington House of Representatives
Morgan State University alumni
African-American state legislators in Washington (state)
Women state legislators in Washington (state)
African-American women in politics
People from Jackson, Tennessee
20th-century African-American people
20th-century African-American women
21st-century African-American people
21st-century African-American women